National Route 286 is a national highway of Japan connecting Taihaku-ku, Sendai and Yamagata, Yamagata in Japan, with a total length of 61.9 km (38.46 mi).

References

National highways in Japan
Roads in Miyagi Prefecture
Roads in Yamagata Prefecture